was a town located on the northern half of Yakushima (Yaku Island) in Kumage District, Kagoshima Prefecture, Japan.

As of 2003, the town had an estimated population of 6,903 and the density of 23.09 persons per km². The total area was 298.95 km².

On October 1, 2007, Kamiyaku, along with the town of Yaku (also from Kumage District), was merged to create the town of Yakushima.

External links

Yakushima Town

Dissolved municipalities of Kagoshima Prefecture